Jesús Manuel Sagredo Chávez (born 10 March 1994) is a Bolivian footballer who plays in Bolivian Primera División for The Strongest on loan from Club Blooming.

Having been with Club Blooming since making his professional debut in 20-7, in January 2021 he joined The Strongest on loan where his brother José Sagredo also already plays.

He made his full debut for Bolivia on the 10 October 2020, against Brazil, he was playing at right back and his brother Jose was at left back.

References

External links
 
 

Living people
Bolivian footballers
Bolivian Primera División players
Bolivia international footballers
Association football defenders
Club Blooming players
Sportspeople from Santa Cruz de la Sierra
1994 births